Antigone is a play by Jean Cocteau, written in Paris in 1922.

The play is the myth as written by Sophocles in 441 BCE, albeit a concise or abridged version. Cocteau himself called it a 'contraction' of the Sophocles text.

The Antigone of Cocteau is modern, yet more traditional than the 1944 adaptation by Jean Anouilh. Cocteau's fondness for mythological subjects is shown in this piece (as in The Infernal Machine (1934)). Antonin Artaud played the role of Tiresias. It is dedicated to Genica Athanasiou, who played the title role.

Adaptations to television 
 1967 : Antigone (by Jean Cocteau, after Sophocles), TV movie by Jean-Claude de Nesle

1922 plays
Plays by Jean Cocteau
Plays based on Antigone (Sophocles play)